The Turkish Women's First Football League is the second-tier league competition for women's association football in Turkey.

Format

Teams promoted to Women's Super League

Format
As of 2022-23 Season, 13 teams (3 teams relegated from Super League and 10 teams promoted from Second League in the end of 2021–22 season) compete for promoting to Super League.

2022–23 season
The 2022-23 Turkish Women's First Football League consists of 13 teams.

See also
 Women's football in Turkey
 Turkish Women's Football Super League
 Turkish Women's Second Football League
 Turkish Women's Third Football League
 Turkish Women's Regional Football League
 List of women's football clubs in Turkey
 Turkish women in sports

References

External links 

 Official Site  of the Turkish Football Federation

Sports leagues established in 2021
First
Tur
Football
Professional sports leagues in Turkey